The Erro  (in Piedmontese Er) is a  torrent of north-west Italy, a right tributary of the Bormida.

Geography 
The river rises in the Ligurian Province of Savona at an elevation  on Monte Ermetta, to the west of Monte Beigua. Having passed through the territory of Sassello, the river enters the Piedmontese Province of Alessandria at Ponte Erro (Malvicino).

Sources
The initial version of this article was a translation from :it:Erro (torrente), its counterpart in the Italian Wikipedia.

References 

Rivers of Italy
Rivers of the Province of Savona
Rivers of the Province of Alessandria